Walter Frederick Osborne (17 June 1859 – 24 April 1903) was an Irish impressionist and  Post-Impressionism landscape and portrait painter, best known for his documentary depictions of late 19th century working class life. Most of his paintings are figurative and focus on women, children, the elderly, the poor, and the day-to-day life of ordinary people on Dublin streets, as well as series of rural scenes. He also produced city-scapes, which he painted from both sketches and photographs. A prolific artist, he produced oils, watercolours, and numerous pencil sketches.

Osborne's talent was evident as a young man and he traveled widely in his youth; studying at the Academie Royale des Beaux Arts in Antwerp. He became a member of the Royal Hibernian Academy after an early showing. Later, he spent time in rural England and Brittany, where he became acquainted with the style of the impressionists. Osborne produced works in oil, water-colour, pastel and pencil. His main source of income was portraiture, landscapes and depictions of animals, but he is today better known for his documentary depictions of Ireland's working class poor.

Osborne had an engaging, charismatic personality and was well thought of in a variety of social circles. He died from pneumonia at 43 years, before achieving his full potential. Today he is regarded as a major Irish artist.

Life

Early life

Walter Osborne was born in Rathmines, Dublin, the second of three sons of William Osborne, a successful animal painter who specialised in portraying horses and dogs for the then prosperous Irish landlords. By the 1880s, many landlords had hit economic difficulties, and William had to focus on painting mostly dogs.

Walter learned from his father that there was money to be earned from painting animals, and he produced quite a few; including of children with their pets, notably his 1885 A New Arrival, and a series of impressionistic works on cows. Yet, according to art historian Campbell, in these paintings, "Osborne eschews the overly sentimental or literary quality of much Victorian genre painting, and displays a more down-to-earth, realistic approach, and a mood of gentleness."

He was educated at Rathmines School and at the Royal Hibernian Academy school.

Success

He won the Taylor Prize in 1881 and 1882, the highest student honour in Ireland of the time, while studying at the Koninklijke Academie voor Schone Kunsten in Antwerp. He was influenced by the Flemish painter Rubens, and the French realist, plein-air painter, Jules Bastien-Lepage, as well as Berthe Morisot. In 1883, Osborne moved from Antwerp to Brittany where he painted his famous Apple Gathering, Quimperlé, now in the National Gallery of Ireland. Soon after, he moved to England where he worked alongside Nathaniel Hill and Augustus Burke at Walberswick. During his period he often returned to Dublin to make preparatory sketches for what became his most renowned series, of the everyday lives of the city's poor. Although highly regarded today, these documentary, street paintings were not commercially successful, and Osborne supplemented his income through portrait paintings of the middle class, which were not as artistically satisfying.

In 1886, he was elected to the Royal Hibernian Academy and received many commissions for portraits. This was an important source of income, as he had no private means of his own. After his sister died he was involved in looking after her daughter, and his own parents became increasingly financially dependent on him.

In 1892, he returned to Ireland to live in the family residence, and he also kept a studio at No. 7 St. Stephen's Green. He spent a considerable amount of time painting outdoors, in Dublin around St. Patrick's Cathedral or in the country. 
He was well liked in social circles and counted the surgeon Sir Thornely Stoker, brother of Bram Stoker, among his best friends.

Death

His mother became ill in the early 1900s, and Walter spend significant periods caring for her. In 1903, while gardening, he overheated himself and caught a chill, which he neglected, and which developed into pneumonia. He died prematurely from the illness on April 24, 1903 at the age of 43. He is buried in Mount Jerome Cemetery.

Some critics have suggested that at the time of his death he was on the brink of his artistic maturity. His final work Tea in the Garden, a fusion of naturalism and impressionism, remained unfinished at his death and is now in the collection of the Hugh Lane Municipal Gallery in Dublin. Today his work is highly sought after by collectors.

Writing in 1943, and lamenting Osborne's early death, Stephen Gwynn wrote that he "never knew a man who seemed more likely than Walter Osborne to live to a happy and vigorous old age". His final work was "Tea in the Garden, described as "a beautiful combination of naturalism and impressionism remained unfinished at his death".

Gallery

References

Notes

Sources

Boylan, Henry. A Dictionary of Irish Biography, 3rd Edition. Dublin: Gill and MacMillan, 1998. 
 Gwynn, Stephen. Walter Osborne and Ireland 1859-1903. Studies: An Irish Quarterly Review, Vol. 32, No. 128, Dec., 1943
Irish Art Archive - Walter Frederick Osborne - Milmo-Penny Fine Art
"The Irish Impressionists, Irish Artists in France and Belgium 1850-1914". Julian Campbell. National Gallery of Ireland, 1984
"A Dictionary of Irish Artists". Library Ireland, 1913

Bibliography
Sheehy, Jeanne. Walter Osborne. Town House, 1991
Campbell, Julian. Walter Osborne in the west of Ireland, Adam's, 2004

External links
Osbourne online (ArtCyclopedia)
Walter Osbourne (Encyclopedia of Irish and World Art)
Walter Osborne at Irish Art

1859 births
1903 deaths
Irish Impressionist painters
19th-century Irish painters
Irish male painters
Painters from Dublin (city)
Walter Osborne
Royal Academy of Fine Arts (Antwerp) alumni
Deaths from pneumonia in the Republic of Ireland
19th-century Irish male artists